Wetback may refer to: 

 Wetback (slur), a derogatory slang term for illegal Mexicans in other countries
 Wetback: The Undocumented Documentary, a 2005 film about undocumented immigration to Canada
 Operation Wetback, a project of the INS that deported about 1 million illegal aliens in 1954
 Wetback Tank, a reservoir in New Mexico
 Water heater, also referred to as a "wetback heater"